

Days of the month

<div id="30_June_2007"> </div id>

30 June  2007 (Saturday)

Auto racing:
IRL: The SunTrust Indy Challenge in Richmond, Virginia
(1) Dario Franchitti  (2) Scott Dixon  (3) Dan Wheldon 
Rugby union: Tri Nations
 20–15  at Melbourne Cricket Ground, Melbourne. The Wallabies come back from a 15–6 halftime deficit to stun the world's top-ranked team.

<div id="29_June_2007"> </div id>

29 June  2007 (Friday)

National Football League: The league announces that NFL Europa, its European developmental league, will be immediately shut down after 16 years of operation. (NFL)
Cricket:
West Indian cricket team in England in 2007
2nd T20: 173/5 (19.3 ov.) beat  169/7 (20 ov.) by 5 wickets Series tied 1–1 with none to play.
2007 Future Cup
 227/4 (49.1 ov.) beats  226/6 (50 ov.) by 6 wickets. Series tied 1–1 with one more to play.
Sachin Tendulkar passes 15,000 career ODI runs in this match.
Major League Baseball
Baltimore Orioles first baseman Aubrey Huff hits for the cycle, becoming the third Orioles player ever to do so, joining Brooks Robinson and Cal Ripken Jr.  He is also the first Oriole to hit one at home in Baltimore, Maryland, hitting a triple in the first inning, a double in the third, a home run in the fifth and a single in the seventh at Oriole Park at Camden Yards.  The Orioles lost the game, however, to the Los Angeles Angels of Anaheim, 9–7.
San Francisco Giants outfielder Barry Bonds hits his 750th home run in the eighth inning off Liván Hernández in a 6–4 loss to the Arizona Diamondbacks.

<div id="28_June_2007"> </div id>

28 June  2007 (Thursday)

Canadian Football League:
Bashir Levingston of the Toronto Argonauts returns a missed field goal from the back of the 20-yard end zone and traverses the 110-yard field for a 129-yard touchdown, the longest play in the history of professional gridiron football. (TSN)
Major League Baseball:
Toronto Blue Jays designated hitter Frank Thomas hit his 500th career home run, a three-run shot, in the first inning of their game at the Metrodome in Minneapolis against the Minnesota Twins' Carlos Silva. He is the 21st member of the 500 home run club.  The Twins won the game, 8–5.
Houston Astros second baseman Craig Biggio collects his 3000th career hit, a seventh-inning single off the Colorado Rockies' Aaron Cook at Minute Maid Park in Houston. Biggio was thrown out trying to stretch the hit to a double. He is the 27th member of the 3000-hit club, and only the ninth player to record all 3000 hits with the same club. This was the third of his five hits in the game, tying his career record. The Astros won 8–5 on Carlos Lee's walk-off grand slam in the 11th inning, with Biggio on third base at the time of the shot.
2007 NBA draft in Madison Square Garden, New York City
Greg Oden was the number one pick by the Portland Trail Blazers, with the Seattle SuperSonics getting Kevin Durant as the second overall choice.
Cricket:
Bangladeshi cricket team in Sri Lanka in 2007
1st Test-4th Day:  577/6 (dec) beat  89 & 254 (87.1 ov.) by an innings and 234 runs
West Indian cricket team in England in 2007
1st T20: 208/8 (20 ov.) beat  193/7 (20 ov.) by 15 runs
Football (soccer):
2007 Copa América in Venezuela
Group C
 5–0  
 4–1  

<div id="27_June_2007"> </div id>

27 June  2007 (Wednesday)

Cricket:
Bangladesh cricket team in Sri Lanka in 2007
1st Test-3rd Day:  577/6 (dec) leads  89 & 233/5 (82.3 ov.) by 255 runs
Football (soccer):
2007 Copa América in Venezuela
Group B
 2–3  
 0–2  
Major League Baseball:
Philadelphia Phillies first baseman Ryan Howard hit his 100th career home run – a 505-foot three-run blast into the Ashburn Alley at Citizens Bank Park – becoming the fastest player to reach that milestone (325 games).  However, the Phillies lost to the Cincinnati Reds, 9–6.

<div id="26_June_2007"> </div id>

26 June  2007 (Tuesday)

Cricket:
Bangladesh cricket team in Sri Lanka in 2007
1st Test-2nd Day:  577/6 (dec) leads  89 & 3/0 (3 ov.) by 485 runs
2007 Future Cup
1st ODI:  245/6 (49.3 ov.) beat  242/8 (50 ov.) by 4 wickets
 leads the 3 ODI series 1–0 with 2 to play.
Football (soccer):
2007 Copa América in Venezuela
Group A
 0–3  
 2–2  

<div id="25_June_2007"> </div id>

25 June  2007 (Monday)

Cricket:
Bangladesh cricket team in Sri Lanka in 2007
1st Test-1st Day:  89 trails  227/3 (51 ov.) by 138 runs
American football:
The Chicago Bears waive defensive tackle Tank Johnson three days after he is arrested in Gilbert, Arizona on suspicion of driving while impaired. (NY Times)

<div id="24_June_2007"> </div id>

24 June  2007 (Sunday)

Soccer:
2007 CONCACAF Gold Cup Final:
 2:1 
Auto racing:
NASCAR Nextel Cup: Toyota/SaveMart 350 at Infineon Raceway.
(1) Juan Pablo Montoya  (2) Kevin Harvick  (3) Jeff Burton
Montoya wins his first Nextel Cup race since moving from Formula One.
IRL: The Iowa Corn Indy 250 in Newton, Iowa
(1) Dario Franchitti  (2) Marco Andretti  (3) Scott Sharp 
Champ Car: Grand Prix of Cleveland in Cleveland, Ohio, USA.
(1) Paul Tracy  (2) Robert Doornbos  (3) Neel Jani 
Baseball:
Major League Baseball interleague play:
Toronto Blue Jays pitcher Dustin McGowan, who had won only five games before in his career, carries a no-hit bid into the ninth inning against the Colorado Rockies. He finishes with a one-hit, one-walk shutout.
2007 College World Series:
The Oregon State Beavers defeat the North Carolina Tar Heels, 9–3, to clinch the best-of-three finals series and win their second straight College World Series. (AP via Yahoo)
Cricket:
2007 Future Cup
 173/4 (31 ov.) beat  131 (30.5 ov.) by 42 runs
Basketball:
Spanish ACB Finals
Real Madrid 83–71 Winterthur FCB, Real Madrid wins championship series, 3–1

<div id="23_June_2007"> </div id>

23 June  2007 (Saturday)

Rugby union: Tri Nations
 21–26  at ABSA Stadium, Durban
Cricket:
2007 Future Cup
 171/1 (34.5 ov.) beat  193 (50 ov.) by 9 wickets (D/L)

<div id="22_June_2007"> </div id>

22 June  2007 (Friday)

Ice hockey:
2007 NHL Entry Draft in Columbus, Ohio:
The Chicago Blackhawks select American right wing Patrick Kane of the Ontario Hockey League's London Knights with the first pick.

<div id="21_June_2007"> </div id>

<div id="20_June_2007"> </div id>

20 June  2007 (Wednesday)

Baseball:
Texas Rangers designated hitter Sammy Sosa hits the 600th home run of his career, becoming only the fifth player in Major League Baseball history to pass the milestone.  He hit the shot off of Jason Marquis in the fifth inning of a game against the Chicago Cubs, for whom he hit 545 homers in 13 seasons.  The ball went into the Rangers bullpen and was caught by relief pitcher Akinori Otsuka.  The Rangers won the game, 7–3. (AP via ESPN)
Football (soccer):
CONMEBOL 2007 Copa Libertadores final
 Grêmio 0–2 Boca Juniors  (aggregate 0–5) (Report)
Boca Juniors win their sixth championship title and advance to the 2007 FIFA Club World Cup.
The Netherlands national under-21 football team reach the final of the UEFA U-21 Championship 2007. Their semi-final against England under-21 ends in 1–1 after extra time. After a shoot-out of 32 penalties (a record in international tournaments) The Netherlands win 13–12.

<div id="19_June_2007"> </div id>

19 June  2007 (Tuesday)

Cricket:
West Indian cricket team in England in 2007
4th Test-5th Day:  400 & 111/3 (21.4 ov.) beat  287 & 222 by 7 wickets.
England win the Test series 3–0

<div id="18_June_2007"> </div id>

18 June  2007 (Monday)

Baseball:
The Baltimore Orioles fire manager Sam Perlozzo and name Dave Trembley interim manager.  The Orioles are 128–172 in his  years at the helm, and were at the bottom of the American League East Division when they let him go.
Cricket:
West Indian cricket team in England in 2007
4th Test-4th Day:  400 lead  287 & 83/3 (19.2 ov.) by 30 runs

<div id="17_June_2007"> </div id>

17 June  2007 (Sunday)

Golf:
Ángel Cabrera of Argentina, who had never won a PGA Tour event, wins the U.S. Open by one stroke over Tiger Woods and Jim Furyk at Oakmont Country Club in Oakmont, Pennsylvania.
Auto racing:
Formula One: United States Grand Prix at the Indianapolis Motor Speedway.
(1) Lewis Hamilton  (2) Fernando Alonso   (3) Felipe Massa 
24 Hours of Le Mans
Audi drivers Marco Werner, Emanuele Pirro, and Frank Biela defeat newcomers Peugeot with the second straight win for the diesel-powered #1 R10 prototype, covering 369 laps for the company's seventh win in eight years. Binnie Motorsport's #31 Lola–Zytek wins in the LMP2 class, Aston Martin Racing's #009 DBR9 defeats Corvette in GT1, and the #76 IMSA Performance Matmut Porsche leads over Ferrari in the GT2 class.
NASCAR NEXTEL Cup: The Citizens Bank 400 in Brooklyn, Michigan
(1) Carl Edwards (2) Martin Truex Jr. (3) Tony Stewart
Cricket:
West Indian cricket team in England in 2007
4th Test-3rd Day:  287 (97.1 ov.) lead  121/4 (34 ov.) by 166 runs
Football (soccer): La Liga
Real Madrid secure their first league championship in four years when they defeat Real Mallorca on the last day of the season by 3–1, edging out FC Barcelona who beat relegated Gimnàstic 5–1 because of Real's better head-to-head record.

<div id="16_June_2007"> </div id>

16 June  2007 (Saturday)

Rugby union:
Tri Nations
 22–19  at Newlands, Cape Town
Internationals
 64–13  at Waikato Stadium, Hamilton
Cricket:
West Indian cricket team in England in 2007
4th Test-2nd Day: 132/4 (40.4 ov.) lead  by 132 runs
Baseball: US Major Leagues
A benches-clearing brawl ensues after San Diego Padres pitcher Chris Young hits Chicago Cubs center fielder Derrek Lee with a pitch.  Young, Lee, Padres pitcher Jake Peavy and Cubs hitting coach Gerald Perry are all ejected.  The incident overshadowed  innings of no-hit ball by Carlos Zambrano, who suffered a 1–0 complete-game loss for the Cubs after a ninth-inning home run by Russell Branyan.

<div id="15_June_2007"> </div id>

15 June  2007 (Friday)

American football:
Utah Blaze (AFL) wide receiver and former NFL player Justin Skaggs passes away due to complications from brain cancer.  He was taken in for emergency surgery the previous day after his brain tumors expanded and built intracranial pressure, and he rapidly deteriorated from there.  He never awoke, and was rendered brain dead.  He was 28.
NCAA College baseball
The 2007 College World Series gets underway at Johnny Rosenblatt Stadium in Omaha, Nebraska.  Eight NCAA Division I baseball teams compete for the national championship.  The event runs until June 25.
Cricket:
West Indian cricket team in England in 2007
4th Test-1st Day:No play, rained out

<div id="14_June_2007"> </div id>

14 June  2007 (Thursday)

Basketball:
2007 NBA Finals: San Antonio Spurs 83, Cleveland Cavaliers 82, San Antonio wins series, 4–0
The Spurs win their fourth NBA title in nine seasons. The Cavs mount a furious rally at the beginning of the fourth quarter to go ahead by three, but San Antonio pulls away thanks to Manu Ginóbili, who scores 13 of his team-leading 27 points in the last 5:24. Tony Parker, who scores 24 in game 4, is named MVP of the finals.
Ice hockey:
Sidney Crosby of the Pittsburgh Penguins wins the Hart Memorial Trophy as the most-valuable player in the 2006–07 National Hockey League season. Teammate Evgeni Malkin wins the Calder Memorial Trophy as the league's top rookie. Martin Brodeur takes the Vezina Trophy as top goaltender for the third time, while Nicklas Lidström of the Detroit Red Wings wins his fifth James Norris Memorial Trophy as the league's top defenceman. Vancouver Canucks coach Alain Vigneault receives the Jack Adams Award as coach of the year.

<div id="13_June_2007"> </div id>

<div id="12_June_2007"> </div id>

12 June  2007 (Tuesday)

Basketball:
2007 NBA Finals: San Antonio Spurs 75, Cleveland Cavaliers 72, San Antonio leads series, 3–0
Major League Baseball:
Justin Verlander of the Detroit Tigers pitches a no-hitter against the Milwaukee Brewers, winning the game 4–0.  (MLB.com)

<div id="11_June_2007"> </div id>

11 June  2007 (Monday)

Cricket:
West Indian cricket team in England in 2007
3rd Test-5th Day: 370 & 313 beat  229 & 394 by 60 runs
England wins series, leading 2–0 with one test to play.

<div id="10_June_2007"> </div id>

10 June  2007 (Sunday)

Basketball:
2007 NBA Finals:
San Antonio Spurs 103, Cleveland Cavaliers 92, San Antonio leads series 2–0
With LeBron James in foul trouble and the Spurs' frontcourt dominant in the paint, San Antonio takes a 28-point lead in the first half and holds on to go up 2–0. (AP via Yahoo)
Tennis: French Open, Paris, France
Men's Singles final:
(2)  Rafael Nadal def. (1)  Roger Federer, 6–3, 4–6, 6–3, 6–4
Auto racing:
Formula One: Canadian Grand Prix in Montreal, Quebec.
(1) Lewis Hamilton  (2) Nick Heidfeld  (3) Alexander Wurz 
NASCAR NEXTEL Cup: The Pocono 500 in Long Pond, Pennsylvania
(1) Jeff Gordon (2) Ryan Newman (3) Martin Truex Jr.
Champ Car: Grand Prix of Portland in Portland, Oregon, USA.
(1) Sébastien Bourdais  (2) Justin Wilson  (3) Robert Doornbos 
Cricket:
West Indian cricket team in England in 2007
3rd Test-4th Day: 370 & 313 lead  229 & 301/5 (98 ov.) by 153 runs

<div id="9_June_2007"> </div id>

9 June  2007 (Saturday)

Auto racing:
IRL: The Bombardier Learjet 550 in Fort Worth, Texas
(1) Sam Hornish Jr.  (2) Tony Kanaan  (3) Danica Patrick 
Cricket:
West Indian cricket team in England in 2007
3rd Test-3rd Day: 370 & 313 lead  229 & 22/1 (8 ov.) by 432 runs
Horse Racing:
Belmont Stakes:
Rags to Riches defeats Preakness Stakes winner Curlin by a head to become the first filly to win the Belmont since 1905. (New York Racing Association)
Tennis: French Open, Paris, France
Women's Singles final:
(1)  Justine Henin def. (7)  Ana Ivanovic, 6–1, 6–2
Rugby union:
Internationals
 24–6  at Malvinas Argentinas, Mendoza
 49–0  at Subiaco Oval, Perth
 61–10  at Westpac Stadium, Wellington
 35–8  at Ellis Park, Johannesburg
French Top 14 Final:
Stade Français 23–18 Clermont at Stade de France, Saint-Denis

<div id="8_June_2007"> </div id>

8 June  2007 (Friday)

Tennis: French Open, Paris, France
Men's Singles semifinals:
(1)  Roger Federer def. (4)  Nikolay Davydenko, 7–5, 7–6 (7–5), 7–6 (9–7)
(2)  Rafael Nadal def. (6)  Novak Djokovic, 7–5, 6–4, 6–2
Football (soccer):
They officially disqualify Denmark and award the match to Sweden, 3–0. In addition, Denmark was fined CHF100,000 (€61,000), and will be forced to play its next four home Euro 2008 qualifier matches at least 250 km away from Copenhagen. Its next home qualifier, against , will be held behind closed doors. Christian Poulsen, who threw the punch against a Swedish player that led to his expulsion and the fan attack, will be suspended for three games. 
Cricket:
West Indian cricket team in England in 2007
3rd Test-2nd Day: 370 & 34/1 (6 ov.) lead  229 by 175 runs
NCAA College sports
The University of Florida re-signs its football and basketball head coaches. Urban Meyer will be paid $3.25 million per year for six years, and Billy Donovan will be paid $3.5 million per year for six years. Both contracts have options for a seventh year.  The deals come a week after Donovan signed on to coach the Orlando Magic, then later asked for the deal to be rescinded. They are now the highest paid college football/basketball coaching tandem in NCAA history. 

<div id="7_June_2007"> </div id>

7 June  2007 (Thursday)

Baseball:
Boston Red Sox pitcher Curt Schilling comes within one out of his first no-hitter. Shannon Stewart breaks up Schilling's bid with a single. Schilling then retires Mark Ellis to preserve a 1–0 shutout win. The only other A's base-runner of the evening reached on an error. (AP via Yahoo)
Basketball:
NBA Finals Game 1 at SBC Center, San Antonio, Texas:
San Antonio Spurs 85, Cleveland Cavaliers 76, San Antonio leads series 1–0
San Antonio's tough defense holds LeBron James to four field goals in 16 attempts, while Tony Parker and Tim Duncan lead the Spurs with 27 and 24 points, respectively. (AP via Yahoo)
After agreeing to rescind their contract with Billy Donovan, the Orlando Magic sign Stan Van Gundy to replace Brian Hill as their head coach.  Donovan will return to the Florida Gators, though the Magic will retain his NBA rights for five years.  The Magic will give the Miami Heat a second-round draft pick in exchange for Van Gundy's rights. 
Tennis: French Open, Paris, France
Women's Singles semifinals:
(1)  Justine Henin def. (4)  Jelena Janković, 6–4, 6–2
(7)  Ana Ivanovic def. (2)  Maria Sharapova, 6–4, 6–2
Soccer: Recopa Sudamericana, Porto Alegre, Brazil
Internacional (Brazil) defeat Pachuca (Mexico) 4–0 in Porto Alegre, erasing a 2–1 first-leg deficit to claim the trophy by a 5–2 aggregate score.
Cricket:
West Indian cricket team in England in 2007
3rd Test-1st Day: 296/7 (86 ov.) lead  by 296 runs

<div id="6_June_2007"> </div id>

6 June 2007 (Wednesday)

Football (soccer) 2008 UEFA European Football Championship qualifying
Group A:  1–1 
Group A:  2–0 
Group A:  1–0 
Group B:  0–2 
Group B:  1–0 
Group B:  0–2 
Group C:  4–0 
Group C:  1–0 
Group C:  2–1 
Group D:  2–1 
Group E:  0–2 
Group E:  0–0 
Group E:  0–3 
Group F:  5–0 
Group F:  0–2 
Group F:  0–2 
Group G:  2–1 
Group G:  0–3 
Group G:  2–0 
Ice hockey:
Stanley Cup playoffs: Stanley Cup Finals:
Anaheim Ducks 6, Ottawa Senators 2, Anaheim wins series, 4–1
Scott Niedermayer wins the Conn Smythe Trophy as MVP of the playoffs.
The Ducks' Chris Pronger becomes the newest member of the Triple Gold Club, formalized last month by the International Ice Hockey Federation. The Club consists of individuals who have won the Stanley Cup along with gold medals at the Olympics and World Championships.
Cricket:
2007 Afro-Asia Cup
1st ODI:  Asia XI 317/9 (50 ov.) beat  Africa XI 283 (47.5 ov.) by 34 runs
Tennis: French Open, Paris, France
Men's Singles quarterfinals:
(2)  Rafael Nadal def. (23)  Carlos Moyá, 6–4, 6–3, 6–0
(6)  Novak Djokovic def.  Igor Andreev, 6–3, 6–3, 6–3
Yachting:
Louis Vuitton Cup 2007
Race 5: Emirates Team New Zealand  beat Luna Rossa  to win the Louis Vuitton Cup 5–0 and the right to challenge Alinghi  for the America's Cup

<div id="5_June_2007"> </div id>

5 June  2007 (Tuesday)

Tennis: French Open, Paris, France
Men's Singles quarterfinals:
(1)  Roger Federer def. (9)  Tommy Robredo, 7–5, 1–6, 6–1, 6–2
(4)  Nikolay Davydenko def. (19)  Guillermo Cañas, 7–5, 6–4, 6–4
Women's Singles quarterfinals:
(1)  Justine Henin def. (8)  Serena Williams, 6–4, 6–3
(2)  Maria Sharapova def. (9)  Anna Chakvetadze, 6–3, 6–4
(7)  Ana Ivanovic def. (3)  Svetlana Kuznetsova, 6–0, 3–6, 6–1
(4)  Jelena Janković def. (6)  Nicole Vaidišová, 6–3, 7–5
Cricket:
2007 Afro-Asia Cup
Only Twenty20:  Asia XI 110/4 (15.5 ov.) beat  Africa XI 109/8 (20 ov.) by 6 wickets

<div id="4_June_2007"> </div id>

4 June  2007 (Monday)

Baseball:
Oakland Athletics second baseman Mark Ellis hits for the cycle in Oakland's 5–4 extra-inning win against the Boston Red Sox.
Auto racing:
NASCAR NEXTEL Cup: The Autism Speaks 400 in Dover, Delaware (postponed from June 3 due to rain)
(1) Martin Truex Jr. (2) Ryan Newman (3) Carl Edwards
Ice hockey:
Stanley Cup playoffs: Stanley Cup Finals:
Anaheim Ducks 3, Ottawa Senators 2, Anaheim leads series 3–1
Two Andy McDonald goals in a one-minute span give the Ducks the lead for good in the second period.

<div id="3_June_2007"> </div id>

3 June  2007 (Sunday)

Auto racing:
IRL: The A.J. Foyt 225 in West Allis, Wisconsin
(1) Tony Kanaan  (2) Dario Franchitti  (3) Dan Wheldon 
Rugby union:

<div id="2_June_2007"> </div id>

2 June 2007 (Saturday)

Basketball:
2007 NBA Playoffs Eastern Conference finals:
Cleveland Cavaliers 98, Detroit Pistons 82, Cleveland wins series, 4–2
Little-known rookie Daniel Gibson scores 31 points — 19 of them in the fourth quarter — to lead the Cavs to their first NBA Finals.
Football (soccer):
2008 UEFA European Football Championship qualifying
Group A:  1–2 
Group A:  0–2 
Group A:  1–2 
Group A:  1–3 
Group B:  1–2 
Group B:  1–0 
Group B:  2–0 
Group C:  3–2 
Group C:  4–0 
Group C:  2–0 
Group D:  0–0 
Group D:  6–0 
Group E:  4–0 
Group E:  1–2 
Group E:  0–1 
Group F:  1–1 
Group F:  0–3 
(Game abandoned in the 89th minute after a Danish fan attacked the referee who had just awarded a penalty to Sweden.  At the time of the abandonment, the game was tied, 3–3.  Sweden was awarded the match after an investigation, June 8.)
Group F:  0–2 
Group G:  2–0 
Group G:  1–2 
Group G:  0–2 
FIFA International friendly:  4–1 
Horse racing:
Favoured Authorized wins The Derby by five lengths, giving his jockey Frankie Dettori his first win in the race in 15 attempts. (BBC)
Ice hockey:
Stanley Cup playoffs: Stanley Cup Finals:
Ottawa Senators 5, Anaheim Ducks 3, Anaheim leads series, 2–1
Rugby union:
Internationals
 16–0 Ireland  at José Amalfitani Stadium, Buenos Aires
 31–0  at Suncorp Stadium, Brisbane
 42–11  at Eden Park, Auckland
 55–22  at Loftus Versfeld, Pretoria
 5–29  at Gran Parque Central, Montevideo
Edinburgh Sevens:
Current season leaders Fiji need only defeat  in their Cup quarterfinal tomorrow to secure the season crown.
Cricket
2007 ICC World Cricket League Division Three
Final
 241/8 (50 ov.) beat  150 (46.3 ov.) by 91 runs
3rd Place
 263/6 (50 ov.) beat  240/9 (50 ov.) by 23 runs
5th Place
 242/6 (50 ov.) beat  113 (33.1 ov.) by 129 runs
7th Place
 124/4 (33 ov.) beat  123 by 6  wickets

<div id="1_June_2007"> </div id>

1 June 2007 (Friday)

NHL Ice hockey
The Pittsburgh Penguins name 19-year-old Sidney Crosby their new captain, making him the youngest in NHL history.
NCAA College baseball
The 2007 NCAA Division I baseball tournament gets underway at 16 locations throughout the United States.  The 64 team  tournament will culminate with 8 teams in the 2007 College World Series.
Football (soccer):
 In the first international match played at the newly refurbished Wembley Stadium, London,  England draw 1–1 with  Brazil in a friendly.

References

06